The Mary MacKillop Bridge is a bascule bridge in Adelaide, Australia that carries the Dry Creek-Port Adelaide railway line over the Port River.

In July 2005, Abigroup was awarded a contract to build a railway bridge and the adjoining Tom 'Diver' Derrick Bridge to carry the Port River Expressway over the Port River. The bridge was built as part of a project to divert the Dry Creek-Port Adelaide line away from the Rosewater loop and bypass the suburban network.

It was opened on 1 August 2008 by Premier Mike Rann.

References

External links

Bascule bridges
Bridges completed in 2008
Buildings and structures in Adelaide
Lefevre Peninsula
Railway bridges in South Australia
2008 establishments in Australia